Nrisingha Temple, Nadia, is an old Narasimha temple situated at Thakurtala, Nrisinghapally, beside Nabadwip-Krishnagar road in Nadia district, in the Indian state of West Bengal.

History
There is a myth that this temple existed right from the time of Satya Yuga. Lord Narasimha came here to wash the blood from his claws after killing Hiranyakasipu. A pond is situated beside the temple. According to mythology this pond was the part of the Mandakini River. Since then this place was known as Narasimha Kshetra or Nrisinghapally. Caitanya Mahaprabhu and his associate Jeev Goswami often came to this temple. 

Krishnachandra Roy, King of Krishnanagar helped to establish the Shrine of Narasimha. The temple was reconstructed in 1896 by Raja Khistish Chandra Roy of Krishnagar.

References

External links

Narasimha temples
19th-century Hindu temples
Hindu temples in West Bengal